Pärnu is the fourth largest city in Estonia. The city sits off the coast of Pärnu Bay, an inlet of the Gulf of Riga, which is a part of the Baltic Sea. In the city, the Pärnu River drains into the Gulf of Riga.

Pärnu is a popular summer holiday resort town among Estonians with many hotels, restaurants and large beaches.  The city is served by Pärnu Airport.

History

Pärnu or Old Pärnu, which was founded by the bishop of Ösel–Wiek , suffered heavily under pressure of the concurrent town, and was finally destroyed . Another town, Embeke (later) was founded by the Livonian Order, who began building an Ordensburg nearby in 1265. The Polish–Lithuanian Commonwealth took control of town between 1560 and 1617; the Poles and Lithuanians fought the Swedes nearby in 1609. Sweden took control of the town during the 16th-century Livonian War as part of Swedish Livonia, although it was not formally ceded by Poland-Lithuania until the 1660 Treaty of Oliva. Sweden then lost Livonia to the Russian Empire in the 1710 Capitulation of Estonia and Livonia and the 1721 Treaty of Nystad, following the Great Northern War. It belonged to the Imperial Russian Governorate of Livonia until 1917, when it was transferred to the short-lived Autonomous Governorate of Estonia. The city is occasionally referred to as Pyarnu, an incorrect reverse-transliteration from the Russian .

The town became part of independent Estonia in 1918 following World War I and the Estonian War of Independence.

The city was occupied by the Soviet Red Army along with the rest of Estonia in 1940 during World War II, and its German population fled the town. It was briefly occupied by Germany from 1941 until 1944 before it was reoccupied by the Soviet Union during its counteroffensives. Pärnu then continued as being part of the Estonian Soviet Socialist Republic from 1944 to 1991, when Estonia restored its independence.

During the Great Northern War, the University of Dorpat (Tartu) was relocated to Pärnu from 1699 to 1710. The university has still maintained a branch campus in Pärnu to this day (1,000 students in the 2004/2005 school year).

Geography

Districts of Pärnu

There are seven districts in Pärnu: Ülejõe, Rääma, Vana-Pärnu, Kesklinn, Rannarajoon, Eeslinn and Raeküla.

Climate 
Pärnu lies within the temperate humid continental climate zone.

Waterbodies
Pärnu River, Sauga River, Reiu River, Pärnu Moat, Pärnu Bay.

Pärnu Moat was previously a part of Pärnu Fortress. Nowadays, it is mainly used as a venue for different events.

Demography

Population change

Ethnic groups

Economy

Today Pärnu is an economically balanced region with a comprehensive range of industries. Foreign investments and new businesses with up-to-date technologies have enhanced job creation and higher competitiveness of the businesses in the world markets. Several enterprises of Pärnu region stand out as the best in Estonia.

Significant flows of exports from Pärnu region and South-Estonia pass through the Port of Pärnu which lies at the mouth of the Pärnu River. In recent years, the port has developed into an important regional harbour for south-western and southern Estonia.
Pärnu's fame as a rehabilitation and holiday resort dates back to the middle of the 19th century. The foundation of the first bathing facility in 1838 is considered the birth date of Pärnu resort. Today Pärnu has all desirable qualities of a modern holiday resort – it has spas and rehabilitation centres, hotels, conference and concert venues, golf courses and tennis courts, restaurants and pubs. Long tradition of as a resort has made Pärnu well known in Finland and Scandinavian countries.

Tourism

The majority of the tourists in Pärnu are Finns, Swedes and Russians. German, Latvian, and Norwegian tourists have also become more common.

In 1837, a tavern near the beach was made into a bathing establishment. The establishment accommodated 5–6 bathrooms that provided hot seawater baths in summer and operated as a sauna in winter. The wooden building was burnt down in the course of World War I. In 1927, the present stone building of Pärnu Mud Baths was erected at the same site.

Since 1996 Pärnu has been known as Estonia's Summer Capital.

Starting from 2015 the city of Pärnu hosts the annual Weekend Festival, the largest dance music festival in the Nordic and Baltic region. Stages are headlined by DJs from across the electronic dance music spectrum, with audiovisual support. Some of the past and upcoming artists to perform include Martin Garrix, David Guetta, Avicii, Steve Aoki, The Chainsmokers, Tiësto, Armin van Buuren, Hardwell, Robin Schulz, Afrojack, deadmau5, Knife Party, Desiigner and many more.
Pärnu is also known for its seawall. According to legend, if a couple holds hands while journeying along the wall and kisses at its endpoint they will stay together forever.

Notable people

 Gustav Fabergé, jeweller
 Johann Voldemar Jannsen, Estonian journalist and poet
 Lili Kaelas, archeologist
 Tõnis Kasemets, race-car driver who has competed in ChampCar and IMSA
 Paul Keres, chess grandmaster
 Lydia Koidula, poet
 Kaie Kõrb, prima ballerina
 Karin Luts, Estonian artist
 Friedrich Martens, lawyer
 Kaili Närep, actress
 David Oistrakh, violinist
 Liisa Pulk, actress
 Rasmus Rändvee, singer
 Salme Reek, actress
 Georg Wilhelm Richmann, German physicist
 Erika Salumäe, track bicycle racer
 David Samoylov, poet
 August Sang, poet 
 Olev Siinmaa, architect
 David Shrayer-Petrov, poet, fiction writer, translator, medical scientist
 Maxim D. Shrayer, author and literary scholar
 Avo Sõmer, musicologist, music theorist, composer
 Kristin Tattar, athlete, disc golf world champion

Honorary citizens
1886 Konstantin Possiet
1901 Friedrich Fromhold Martens
1934 Konstantin Päts
2007 Neeme Järvi
2008 Valter Ojakäär
2009 Jüri Jaanson

Gallery

See also
Pärnu Leht

References

External links

 The Official Tourist Information Centre Foundation of Pärnu
 Parnu tour overview 
 Sightseeing on Your own
 MERKO: 2010–2011 Pärnu moat and park area reconstruction, land reclamation and landscaping, with 6 photos
 Maxim D. Shrayer. Dunes of Happiness: Fifteen Summers in Estonia. Baltic Worlds (September 2013).

 
Cities and towns in Estonia
Populated places in Pärnu County
Gulf of Riga
Populated coastal places in Estonia
Port cities and towns of the Baltic Sea
Spa towns in Estonia
13th-century establishments in Estonia
Populated places established in the 1250s
1251 establishments in Europe
Kreis Pernau
Members of the Hanseatic League
Port cities and towns in Estonia